Wayne Edward Deledio (born 29 November 1955) is a former Australian rules footballer who played with Carlton in the Victorian Football League (VFL). Deledio later played for Brunswick in the Victorian Football Association. 

His son Brett Deledio was the first pick in the 2004 AFL Draft and went on to play 275 games for the Richmond Football Club and Greater Western Sydney Giants.

Notes

External links 

Wayne Deledio's profile at Blueseum

1955 births
Carlton Football Club players
Living people
Australian rules footballers from Victoria (Australia)
Brunswick Football Club players